Praktiker AG was a German hardware store chain which operated in Europe. It was based in Hamburg and opened its first store in 1978 in Luxembourg under the name bâtiself. Initially owned by ASKO, the chain became a division of Metro AG after the merger of ASKO with Metro Cash & Carry in 1995. It was spun off under the name Praktiker Holding in November 2005 and listed on the Frankfurt Stock Exchange. Since 2006 until 2011 was listed on MDAX and since 2011 until 2013 on SDAX.

In contrast to most of its German competitors, the company grew up by buying up various small DIY chains and building material stores. In addition, there was expansion into the new federal states and other European countries in the 1990s. After Metro AG's withdrawal as shareholder in 2006, the company experienced an existential crisis and posted high losses for years. Despite intensive efforts and considerable financial injections, the attempts to restructure failed.

On July 10, 2013 Praktiker AG filed for insolvency at the Hamburg district court the following day for the eight domestic subsidiaries, including Extra Bau+Hobby.  The insolvency application for Praktiker AG was filed on July 12, 2013 at the Saarbrücken District Court and on 25 July 2013 for the Max Bahr subsidiary. The Praktiker and Extra stores were closed on 30 November 2013, followed by the Max Bahr stores on February 25, 2014.

External subsidiares were not affected by the bankruptcy. All of them were sold to other companies between 2013 and 2015. The name Praktiker continues to be used by former subsidiaries in Bulgaria, Greece, Hungary and Turkey.

In 2016 two German businessmen acquired the naming rights and opened under praktiker.de a home improvement online store.

Operations

Germany
In 1979 Praktiker opened its first four stores in Germany. Over the years Praktiker took over many smaller companies and changed most of their stores into Praktiker stores:
 1979: 9 "BayWa" stores
 1985: 12 "Wickes" stores
 1991: "Esbella", "Continent"
 1993: "BLV", "MHB", "Massa", "Huma", "Extra", "Real-Kauf"
 1996: 27 "Bauspar" stores
 1997: 60 "Wirichs" stores
 1998: 25 "Extra" franchise stores
 2000: 27 "Top-Bau" stores
 2006: 76 "Max Bahr" stores

The Praktiker management began in late 2012 with the transformation of 119 Praktiker stores to Max Bahr stores. At the end of this process in December 2013 Germany should have 117 Praktiker and 196 Max Bahr outlets, at the beginning of that process there were 236 Praktiker and 78 Max Bahr stores. Because of the insolvency applications in July 2013 all those plans are stopped, with 54 former Praktiker stores already transferred to Max Bahr outlets. The companies Hellweg and Globus failed to reach an agreement with the Royal Bank of Scotland to buy 59 Max Bahr stores in November 2013. All Praktiker, Extra Bau+Hobby and Max Bahr stores were closed by the end of November 2013 (Praktiker, Extra, 40 Max Bahr stores) or at the end of February 2014 (remaining Max Bahr stores).

Europe

Former subsidiaries still using Praktiker name
The Bulgarian subsidiary, Praktiker EOOD, was sold to Videolux Holding AD. The company which operates electronics retailer Technopolis, opened two new stores and reconstructed all Praktiker stores in the end of 2017.

Praktiker Greece was sold on April 8, 2014 to Canadian investor Fairfax Financial.

The 19 Hungarian Praktiker stores were sold to Papag AG in January 2015,  and again to Wallis Group in January 2016.

In Turkey, Praktiker initially closed the 9 stores after it failed to find a buyer. Later stores were bought by Uygulama Yapı Marketleri Inc. and were reopened, followed by the opening of new stores.

Former subsidiaries
The three Luxembourgian "bâtiself" stores in Foetz, Strassen and Ingeldorf were sold in October 2013. Now the bâtiself stores were rebranded and are not anymore related to the Praktiker brand.

In Ukraine, the first store was opened on November 29, 2007 in Donetsk, three more opened in Lviv, Mykolaiv and Kyiv. The stores were sold on February 11, 2014 to Ukrainian investor Kreston Guarantee Group.
The network was rebranded in 2017 as Leroy Merlin.

Praktiker Romania S.R.L. which operated 27 stores in Romania, was sold to Search Chemicals in February 2014,. In 2017, 20 stores were bought by Kingfisher plc, and rebranded as Brico Dépôt.

The 24 Praktiker stores in Poland were sold to Papag AG in March 2014. However the group was declared bankrupted in 2017, and all the stores were closed, part of the former Praktiker stores are now part of the Castorama network detained by Kingfisher.

In Albania, the first store was opened on October 30, 2009 in Tirana. It was closed on November 30, 2011 due to the restructuring.

In Moldova, the company had planned to open a store in 2009 in Chişinău, but it was canceled later.

References

External links
 Praktiker.de
 Praktiker Bulgaria
 Praktiker Greece
 Praktiker Hungary
 Praktiker Turkey
 Praktiker Poland (Archive)
 Praktiker Romania (Archive)
 Praktiker Ukraine (Archive)

Hardware stores
Companies based in Hamburg
Retail companies established in 1978
Retail companies disestablished in 2014
German brands
Defunct retail companies of Romania